The Cutting Edge is a 1992 American sports-romantic comedy film directed by Paul Michael Glaser and written by Tony Gilroy. The plot is about a wealthy, spoiled figure skater (played by Moira Kelly) who is paired with an injury-sidelined ice hockey player (played by D. B. Sweeney) for Olympic figure skating. Competing at the 1992 Winter Olympics in Albertville, France, they have a climactic face off against a Soviet pair. It spawned a film series including a number of sequels. The film was primarily shot in Toronto and Hamilton, Ontario, Canada.

Plot
Kate Moseley is a world-class figure skater representing the United States in the pairs event at the 1988 Winter Olympics in Calgary. She has genuine talent, but years of being spoiled by her wealthy widower father Jack has made her impossible to work with.

Doug Dorsey is captain of the U.S. ice hockey team at the same Winter Olympics. Just minutes before a game, he and Kate collide in a hallway in the arena. During the game, Doug suffers a head injury that permanently damages his peripheral vision, costing him a shot to play in the NHL and forcing him to retire from ice hockey. During Kate's event, her partner apparently accidentally drops her, albeit with little sign of regret or concern, during their program, costing them a chance at the gold medal.

While training for the 1992 Winter Olympics over the next two years, Kate drives away all potential skating partners with her attitude and perfectionism. Her coach, Russian native Anton Pamchenko, has to find a replacement, an outsider who doesn't know that Kate is spoiled and difficult. He tracks down Doug, who is back home in Minnesota, working in a steel mill and as a carpenter on the side, living with his brother, and playing in a hockey bar league. Desperate for another chance at Olympic glory, Doug agrees to work as Kate's partner, even though he has macho contempt for figure skating.

Kate's snooty, prima donna behavior gets on his nerves immediately, and their first few practices do not go well as they antagonize each other. However, they develop a mutual respect as both strive to outdo each other in work ethic. As their relationship grows warmer, they learn to set aside their differences, becoming a pair to be reckoned with both on and off the ice. Kate even boldly defends Doug to her former coach who patronizes and insults them, and Doug defends his unusual choice of sport to his own family and friends, whom he had expected to mock him.

At the U.S. Nationals, despite strong performances in the short program and long program, they seem to place third, shattering their Olympic dreams. However, when one of the leading pairs falls during the competition, they advance to second place, earning their spot on the Olympic team. However, their potential is threatened by their growing attraction to each other. Kate attempts to seduce Doug after a night of drunken celebration, revealing that she broke off her engagement to wealthy financier Hale Forrest. Usually a ladies' man, Doug uncharacteristically rebuffs her advances, fearing the possibility of regret and loss of respect for each other. 

When Kate discovers that Doug has bedded another woman (a rival skater) almost immediately after leaving her to sleep off her intoxication, she becomes enraged. However, the temporary rift is set aside as they attempt to train in a risky skating move invented by Pamchenko, which will assure them a gold medal if they can pull it off without serious injury.

At the finals at the Albertville Olympics, they look to be one of the top pairs competing for the gold. However, another argument threatens their chemistry on the ice, and in the process Doug and Kate both discover that Kate is the fallible partner after all. Before getting on the ice for their decisive performance, Doug professes to Kate that he has fallen in love with her, leaving Kate to overcome with emotion, and she decides they are going to do the Pamchenko. They proceed to skate with a passion neither had shown before, performing the Pamchenko flawlessly. Kate tells Doug she also loves him and they kiss each other before the cheering crowd.

Cast
 D. B. Sweeney as Doug Dorsey
 Moira Kelly as Kate Moseley
 Roy Dotrice as Anton Pamchenko
 Terry O'Quinn as Jack Moseley
 Dwier Brown as Hale Forrest
 Chris Benson as Walter Dorsey
 Michael Hogan as Doctor
 Kevin Peeks as Brian Newman
 Rachelle Ottley as Lorie Peckarovski
 Barry Flatman as Rick Tuttle
 Christine Hough and Doug Ladret, as Soviet team Smilkov and Brushkin. This Canadian figure skating pair finished 9th in the actual Olympic competition portrayed in the film, just 6 weeks before the film was released.
 Sharon Carz - skating double for Kate Moseley 
 John Denton - skating double for Doug Dorsey

Music
The original music score was composed by Patrick Williams. The film's theme song "Feels Like Forever" was performed by Joe Cocker and written by Diane Warren and Bryan Adams.

Soundtrack
The soundtrack album was originally released by Rykodisc in 1998; in 2004 it was reissued by Varèse Sarabande with 20 minutes of Patrick Williams' score (tracks 11–22).

 Street of Dreams – Nia Peeples
 Cry All Night – Neverland
 Ride On Time – Black Box
 Groove Master – Arrow
 It Ain't Over 'til It's Over – Rosemary Butler & John Townsend
 Shame Shame Shame – Johnny Winter
 Turning Circles – Sally Dworsky
 Baby Now I – Dan Reed Network
 I've Got Dreams to Remember – Delbert McClinton
 Feels Like Forever (Theme From The Cutting Edge) – Joe Cocker
 Ich Namen Gita/Olympic Hockey
 Battle of the CD's
 Limo to Mansion/Nine Months Later
 Kate Skates Alone
 Chicago Practices
 Hoedown
 Tequila
 Olympic Fanfare/Dubois & Gercel
 Doug & Kate Get Angry
 The Russians Skate
 Finale
 End Credits

The following songs are heard in the movie but not included on the soundtrack album:
 Lauretta – Malcolm McLaren
 Love Shack – Rosemary Butler
 Auld Lang Syne – Rosemary Butler & Warren Wiebe
 Walking the Dog – John Townsend
 The Race – Yello
 Diddley Daddy – Chris Isaak

Reception
The Cutting Edge was released on March 27, 1992, and grossed $25,105,517 domestically.

The film was met with mixed critical reviews. On Rotten Tomatoes, it has an approval rating of 57% based on 35 reviews, with the site's consensus: "Part contrived romance, part hackneyed sports drama, The Cutting Edge shows how difficult it can be to figure skate through cheese." Audiences surveyed by CinemaScore gave the film a grade "A−" on scale of A to F.

A review in The Baltimore Sun dubbed it ""Taming of the Shrew" on ice", in reference to Shakespeare's The Taming of the Shrew.

Sequels
The film was followed by several sequels: The Cutting Edge: Going for the Gold (2006), The Cutting Edge: Chasing the Dream (2008) and The Cutting Edge: Fire and Ice (2010), each with mostly different casts. The first sequel which involves the couple's daughter moves the timing of The Cutting Edge from 1992 back to the 1984 Winter Olympics so that their daughter could be 21 at the time of the sequel.

References

External links

 
 
 
 
 

1992 films
1992 comedy-drama films
1990s American films
1990s English-language films
1990s romantic comedy-drama films
1990s sports comedy-drama films
American ice hockey films
American romantic comedy-drama films
American sports comedy-drama films
Films about Olympic figure skating
Films about the 1988 Winter Olympics
Films about the 1992 Winter Olympics
Films based on The Taming of the Shrew
Films directed by Paul Michael Glaser
Films scored by Patrick Williams
Films set in 1988
Films set in 1992
Films shot in Hamilton, Ontario
Films with screenplays by Tony Gilroy
Interscope Communications films
Metro-Goldwyn-Mayer films